Birdland were an English rock band, active between 1988 and 1993.

History
Birdland were formed in 1988 in Birmingham, England by the brothers Robert (vocals) and Lee Vincent (guitar), who had previously released records and toured in the glam rock band Zodiac Motel (1984–1988). The other band members were Simon Rogers (bass) and Neil Hughes (drums).

Birdland's debut single, "Hollow Heart", was released on Lazy Records. It reached No. 1 in the UK Indie Chart. The band generated a lot of attention in the British music press. The band released four further singles: "Paradise", "Sleep with Me", "Everybody Needs Somebody", and "Rock n Roll Nigger", all of which were No. 1 UK independent singles. "Sleep With Me" also reached the Top 40 in the UK Singles Chart (with the video being shown on Top of the Pops). It was two years after the first single that the band finally released their eponymously titled debut album in 1991.

After the album's release, problems with management and inner band disagreement forced the band to split up. They briefly reunited in 2011 and streamed a new demo.

Discography

Studio albums
1991: Birdland - UK No. 44

Live albums
1989: Semi Official Live Album

Singles
1989: "Hollow Heart" - UK Indie Chart #1, UK Singles Chart No. 70
1989: "Paradise" - UK Indie No. 1, UK Singles Chart No. 70
1989: "Live"
1990: "Sleep With Me" - UK Indie No. 1, UK Singles Chart No. 32
1990: "Rock N Roll Nigger" - UK Indie No. 1, UK Singles Chart No. 47
1991: "Everybody Needs Somebody" - UK Indie No. 1, UK Singles Chart No. 44

References

External links
Myspace.com
Birdland history, discography, memorabilia, etc.
Birdland Fansite
The VMPE interview

English rock music groups
Musical groups established in 1989
Musical groups disestablished in 1993